Dave Wilson is a male former athlete who competed for England.

Athletics career
He represented England in the high jump at the 1958 British Empire and Commonwealth Games in Cardiff, Wales.

References

English male high jumpers
Athletes (track and field) at the 1958 British Empire and Commonwealth Games
Commonwealth Games competitors for England
1938 births
Living people